Schistophleps subtilis is a moth in the subfamily Arctiinae. It was described by Jeremy Daniel Holloway in 1979. It is found in New Caledonia.

References

Moths described in 1979
Nudariina